Brooklyn Sudano is an American actress and director. She starred as Vanessa Scott in the ABC comedy series My Wife and Kids and later played the leading role in the 2006 drama film Rain. Sudano has appeared in films such as Alone in the Dark II (2008), Turn the Beat Around (2010) and With This Ring (2015), and starred in the NBC action series, Taken (2017). 

Sudano is the daughter of Grammy Award-winning singer Donna Summer and songwriter Bruce Sudano, and the older sister of Amanda Sudano of the music duo Johnnyswim. Sudano directed the documentary film, Love to Love You, Donna Summer, which premiered in 2023.

Early life 
Sudano was born in Los Angeles, California, to African American singer Donna Summer and Italian American songwriter Bruce Sudano. She was named after her father's hometown of Brooklyn, New York City. Her younger sister (by 19 months) is singer and songwriter Amanda Sudano of Johnnyswim. She has an older half-sister, Mimi Sommer, from her mother's first marriage to Helmut Sommer. As a baby, she was featured in her mother's song "Brooklyn" on the record I'm a Rainbow.

Sudano spent the early part of her childhood on a 56-acre ranch in Thousand Oaks, California until her family moved to Connecticut when she was 10 years old. When she was 14, her family relocated to Nashville, Tennessee. Here, Sudano gravitated toward the arts. She also sang in the gospel choir at church. Sudano and her sisters spent summers touring and singing backing vocals for their famous mother. In her leisure, she studied dance and wrote songs.

She attended high school at Christ Presbyterian Academy where she appeared in all the theater productions. Sometimes Sudano accompanied her parents while they toured around the world, continuing her studies with tutors. A distinguished student, she was valedictorian at her graduation.

Upon graduation, Sudano was accepted at Brown, Duke and Georgetown University. However, she chose to remain close to home and attended Vanderbilt University. Sudano eventually left Vanderbilt to study at the Lee Strasberg Theatre and Film Institute in New York.

Career 
While studying acting in New York, Sudano was spotted by a modelling agent and signed to the Ford Modeling Agency. She appeared in numerous advertising campaigns in print and television, including Clairol, Clean & Clear and K-Mart. In 2003, Sudano replaced Meagan Good as Vanessa Scott on My Wife and Kids. Vanessa is Junior's girlfriend and later wife, who first appears in the season finale of season 3 (played by Good). Sudano continued as a regular cast member throughout the rest of the series' five-year run.

In 2006, Sudano made her big screen debut with the leading role in the film adaptation of V. C. Andrews' novel Rain. She appeared in the horror films Somebody Help Me (2007) and Alone in the Dark II (2008) and well as the MTV romantic drama film, Turn the Beat Around in 2010. In 2015, she co-starred opposite Regina Hall, Jill Scott and Eve in the romantic comedy-drama, With This Ring. On television, Sudano guest starred on Cuts, CSI: NY, $#*! My Dad Says, Body of Proof and Ballers. In 2016, she played the role of Christy Epping in the Hulu miniseries 11.22.63. In 2017, Sudano starred in the first season of 
NBC's action series, Taken. In 2021, she began starring as Angela Prescott in the Freeform thriller series, Cruel Summer.

Alongside Roger Ross Williams, Sudano directed the 2023 documentary film, Love to Love You, Donna Summer about her mother, Donna Summer. It had its world premiere at the 73rd Berlin International Film Festival.

Personal life 
Sudano married her longtime boyfriend, Mike McGlaflin, on October 8, 2006. The couple's wedding inspired Bruce Sudano's song "It's Her Wedding Day".

Sudano and McGlaflin have a daughter, and reside in the Los Angeles area.

Filmography

Film

Television

References

External links 

Rain: An Interview with Brooklyn Sudano
Artist Direct

Living people
1981 births
Actresses from Tennessee
American film actresses
American people of Italian descent
American television actresses
Lee Strasberg Theatre and Film Institute alumni
Donna Summer
African-American actresses
Actresses from Los Angeles
Singers from Los Angeles
Singers from Nashville, Tennessee
21st-century American singers
21st-century American women singers
African-American women singers